Shahpura (also known as Shahpur) is a village in Jangaon district, Telangana, India. A hill-fort exists here which was occupied by the highwayman and bandit Papadu between around 1701 and 1710, during the reign of the Mughal emperor Aurangzeb. The fort endured a series of four sieges before Papadu was captured and executed. A number of Sufi mystics were laid to rest in Shahpura between the fifteenth and seventeenth centuries.

References

Villages in Jangaon district